Manuel Pazos González (17 March 1930 – 24 May 2019) was a Spanish professional footballer who played a goalkeeper.

Career
Born in Cambados, Pazos played for Celta Vigo, Real Madrid, Hércules, Atlético Madrid and Elche.

He died on 24 May 2019, aged 89.

References

1930 births
2019 deaths
Spanish footballers
RC Celta de Vigo players
Real Madrid CF players
Hércules CF players
Atlético Madrid footballers
Elche CF players
La Liga players
Association football goalkeepers